Omar Sy  (born 20 January 1978) is a French actor, best known in France for his sketches with Fred Testot on the Service après-vente des émissions television show on Canal+ (2005–2012). He gained wider recognition for his role in the 2011 comedy-drama film Intouchables, which earned him the César Award for Best Actor, making him the first Black recipient of the award. He later appeared in X-Men: Days of Future Past (2014), Jurassic World (2015), Two Is a Family (2016), Chocolat (2016), Inferno (2016), Transformers: The Last Knight (2017), the Netflix-produced series Lupin (2021–present), Jurassic World Dominion and The Takedown (2022).

Early life
The fourth of eight children, Sy was born on 20 January 1978 in Trappes in the Yvelines department of the Île-de-France region. Both of his parents are immigrants from West Africa. His Mauritanian mother, Diaratou, worked as a house cleaner, and his Senegalese father, Demba, worked in an auto parts factory, after moving from Bakel to France in 1962. Sy is of Fulani origin. He was raised in a habitation à loyer modéré in Trappes. The family visited Senegal every other summer, and spoke  Pulaar at home.

Career

Sy began his career after high school in 1996, working at Radio Nova, where he met his comedy partner Fred Testot. Afterwards, he appeared in the TV show Le Cinéma de Jamel on Canal+, with Jamel Debbouze. He then created a TV show called Le Visiophon. Following these roles, he appeared in various TV and stage shows such as Je ne fais pas mon âge and Omar et Fred: le spectacle. Most notably, Sy co-hosted Service après-vente des émissions, a French short comedy television series, with Testot from 2005 to 2012 on Canal+ until it was cancelled.

He appeared in the television game show Fort Boyard in 2006.

Sy then went to Los Angeles, where he lent his voice to Zip in the French version of the Tomb Raider Legend video game. He previously had also voiced a sheep in Disney's Brother Bear.

In 2008, he appeared in "Bienvenue chez les Bylkas", a video clip by Sinik. In 2009, he voiced some of the characters of Logorama with his partner Fred Testot.

In 2011, Sy starred in The Intouchables, playing a streetwise young man who becomes the personal care assistant to a wealthy quadriplegic (played by François Cluzet). The film enjoyed tremendous success, topping the French box office in 2011 and becoming the best selling French film of all time in its native country, with more than 19 million tickets sold. As a result, Sy was voted third favourite French personality behind Yannick Noah and Zinedine Zidane. The role earned him the 2012 Globe de Cristal for Best Actor. He also received a nomination for a Satellite Award for Best Actor. He and co-star François Cluzet were jointly bestowed the Best Actor Award at the Tokyo International Film Festival. Additionally, he won the César Award for Best Actor in 2012 for the same film.

On 30 December 2012, Sy was voted the favourite personality in France, based on a poll run by Le Journal du Dimanche, ahead of fellow actor Gad Elmaleh.

In 2014, Sy appeared in X-Men: Days of Future Past, playing the character Bishop. He also starred in Samba, directed by Olivier Nakache and Éric Toledano. He co-starred in the fourth installment of the Jurassic Park franchise, Jurassic World, which was released in June 2015. In 2015, alongside Bradley Cooper, he played a compromised chef in Burnt. In 2017, he voiced the character Hot Rod in the film Transformers: The Last Knight, the fifth installment in the Transformers series. In 2021, he starred in Netflix's hit series Lupin, a modern day retelling of Arsène Lupin novels. Lupin has become one of the most-watched non-English series on Netflix. More recently, Sy has signed a multi-year feature film deal with Netflix. In 2021, he was included on the Time 100, Times annual list of the most influential people in the world.
Most recently, Sy signed a first-look deal with HBO Max, to develop series for multiple markets, especially those that are French-speaking.

Personal life
On 5 July 2007, Sy married Hélène, the mother of his five children, in Tremblay-sur-Mauldre. They had been together for ten years before they got married. Hélène runs CéKeDuBonheur, a nonprofit supporting children’s wards at French hospitals, and Siyah Organics, a Sénégalo-American organic-food-supplements company. The family resided in Montfort-l'Amaury, a commune of Île-de-France, before moving to Los Angeles in 2012. After moving to Los Angeles, Sy met with a language tutor daily and watched Keeping Up with the Kardashians to improve his English.

Sy is Muslim.

Sy is a supporter of Olympique de Marseille.

Filmography

Film

Television

Video games

Awards and nominations

References

External links

 Omarius et Fred
 

1978 births
Best Actor César Award winners
Best Actor Lumières Award winners
French comedians
French male comedians
French male film actors
French male television actors
French male voice actors
French Muslims
French people of Mauritanian descent
French people of Senegalese descent
Living people
People from Trappes
21st-century French male actors
20th-century French male actors
French people of Fulbe descent
French expatriate male actors in the United States
Senegalese male film actors
Senegalese male television actors